De Pernas pro Ar 2 is a 2012 Brazilian comedy film, directed by Roberto Santucci and written by Mariza Leão. It is a sequel of the 2010 film De Pernas pro Ar, starring Ingrid Guimarães, Bruno Garcia, Maria Paula, Eriberto Leão, Denise Weinberg, Cristina Pereira and Christine Fernandes.

It was the first film broadcast via satellite to movie theaters in Brazil. On December 20, 2012 the film was broadcast simultaneously in two special sessions for special guests: one at the Cine Carioca in Rio de Janeiro, and another at the Cine Roxy, in Santos.

Plot
Alice (Ingrid Guimarães) becomes a successful businesswoman, without leaving aside the sexual pleasure, she also continues to work much more. She's quite busy due to the opening of the first branch of her sex shop in New York City, alongside partner Marcela (Maria Paula). Her big goal is to bring to America an unreleased erotic product, which causes her to be quite stressed.

During the celebration for the 100th SexDelícia store in Brazil, Alice has an outbreak due to overwork. She is hospitalized at a spa operated by the rigid Regina (Alice Borges), where she meets several people who seek to control their obsessions and anxieties.

Cast 

 Ingrid Guimarães as Alice Segretto
 Bruno Garcia as João
 Maria Paula Fidalgo as Marcela
 Tatá Werneck as Juliana Tavares
 Eriberto Leão as Ricardo
 Denise Weinberg as Marion
 Cristina Pereira as Rosa
 Christine Fernandes as Vitória Prattes
 Eduardo Melo as Paulinho
 Alice Borges as Regina
 Luís Miranda as Mano Love
 Pia Manfroni as Valéria
 Wagner Santisteban as Leozinho
 Rodrigo Sant'Anna as Garçom Geraldo
 Edmilson Barros as Peão
 Dudu Sandroni as Dr. Rafael

References

External links
 

2010s Portuguese-language films
Brazilian comedy films
Pornochanchada
2010s sex comedy films
Films directed by Roberto Santucci
Films shot in Rio de Janeiro (city)
Films set in Rio de Janeiro (city)
Films shot in New York City
Films set in New York City
Brazilian sequel films
2012 comedy films
2012 films